The Berlin University Alliance is a consortium of three universities and one hospital in Berlin: the Free University of Berlin, the Humboldt University of Berlin, the Technical University of Berlin, and the  Charité – Berlin University of Medicine.

Partner universities of the Berlin University Alliance, for instance the Free University of Berlin and the Humboldt University of Berlin, are highly ranked within Germany and abroad, with both of the aforementioned given the status of Germany's Universities of Excellence - the German Ivy League of public institutions.

In 2019 the Alliance has won funding of 24 million euros per annum in the Universities of Excellence funding line of the Excellence Strategy for its future concept ‘Crossing Boundaries toward an Integrated Research Environment’.

In the Excellence Strategy research competition run by the German federal and state governments, the following seven Clusters of Excellence of the Alliance have been approved. As of 2019, the interdisciplinary research projects are each being funded in the Clusters of Excellence funding line for seven years with up to ten million euros per annum.

 MATH+: The Berlin Mathematics Research Center
 Matters of Activity: Image Space Material – A new culture of material
 NeuroCure – New perspectives in the therapy of neurological diseases
 SCIoI – Science of Intelligence – Learning to understand intelligence
 Scripts – Global challenges for liberal democracy as a model of organization
 Temporal Communities – A global perspective on literature
 Unifying Systems in Catalysis (UniSysCat) – Sustainability needs catalysis research

Artificial intelligence research institutes:
 The Berlin Institute for the Foundations of Learning and Data (BIFOLD), a German national competence center for AI research
 The Alliance is one of the German national high performance computing locations

References

External links 
 

College and university associations and consortia in Europe